Tamniès is a commune in the Dordogne department in Nouvelle-Aquitaine in southwestern France.

Population

See also
Communes of the Dordogne department

External links 
 official website of Tamniès village

References

Communes of Dordogne